was a train station located on the Kurihara Den'en Railway Company Kurihara Den'en Railway Line in Kurihara, Miyagi Prefecture, Japan.

Line
Kurihara Den'en Railway Company, Kurihara Den'en Railway Line

Surrounding area

History
31 December 1929: Station begins operation.
1 April 2007: Station ends operation.

Adjacent stations

Railway stations in Miyagi Prefecture
Kurihara Den'en Railway Line
Defunct railway stations in Japan
Railway stations in Japan opened in 1929
Railway stations closed in 2007